The 1881 Chios earthquake occurred at 13:40 local time (11:30 UTC) on 3 April. It caused severe damage on the island of Chios and also affected Çeşme and Alaçatı on the coast of Turkey. The earthquake had an estimated magnitude of 7.3 and there were an estimated 7,866 casualties. The devastation from the earthquake was the last of the three 'catastrophes' that affected the island of Chios in the 19th century.

Tectonic setting
The Aegean Sea is an area of mainly extensional tectonics caused by the subduction of the African Plate beneath Aegean Sea Plate.

Damage
The town of Chios was devastated, causing many casualties, partly due to the narrowness of the streets. In the rest of the island, 25 out of the 64 villages were destroyed with another 17 badly damaged. In both Çeşme and Alaçatı about 40% of the houses were destroyed.

The number of casualties on the Turkish mainland was low, possibly due to most of the inhabitants leaving their houses to watch the passage of the passenger ship Aya Evangelistra from the shore.

Characteristics
The epicenter of the earthquake was in the southeastern part of Chios where intensities reached IX (Violent) on the Mercalli intensity scale. Isoseismal maps show an elongation west to east with an area of intensity VIII (Severe) affecting the western end of the Karaburun Peninsula of the Turkish mainland. Magnitudes ranging from  = 6.5  to = 7.3  have been estimated for this event.

A minor tsunami was reported, based on the presence of fresh sand in a garden in Chios, but there is no other information available.

There were many strong aftershocks, the most damaging being on 5 April, 11 April (2), 12 April, 13 April, 18 April, 20 May, 9 June and 26 August.

Aftermath
After the earthquake many of the inhabitants of Chios left the island. This followed the trend set by the other two 'catastrophes' of the 19th century that devastated the island, the massacre of Chios in 1822 and the failure of the orange crop in 1833. Together these events left most of Chios in a state of poverty and severely underpopulated.

See also
 List of earthquakes in Greece
 List of historical earthquakes

References

1881 Chios
1881 Chios
1881 in Greece
1881 in the Ottoman Empire
1881
1881 earthquakes
April 1881 events
1881 disasters in Greece
1881 disasters in the Ottoman Empire